Delmaine Chesley Christians is a South African politician who has been a permanent delegate to the National Council of Provinces since May 2019. She is a member of the Northern Cape provincial delegation. Christians is a party member of the Democratic Alliance.

Parliamentary career
Christians was elected to the National Council of Provinces following the general election that was held on 8 May 2019. She took office as an MP on 23 May 2019. She is one of six permanent delegates from the Northern Cape. On 24 June, she received her committee assignments.

Committee assignments
Select Committee on Education and Technology, Sports, Arts and Culture
Select Committee on Health and Social Services

References

External links

Living people
Year of birth missing (living people)
People from the Northern Cape
Democratic Alliance (South Africa) politicians
21st-century South African politicians
21st-century South African women politicians
Members of the National Council of Provinces
Women members of the National Council of Provinces